Obruchevsky District is an administrative district (raion), one of the twelve in South-Western Administrative Okrug of the federal city of Moscow, Russia.  As of the 2010 Census, the total population of the district was 78,619.

Municipal status
As a municipal division, it is incorporated as Obruchevsky Municipal Okrug.

Economy
RusHydro, the world's second-largest hydroelectric power producer, has its head office in the district.

References

Notes

Sources

Districts of Moscow
South-Western Administrative Okrug